Welschnofen is a comune (municipality) in the autonomous province of South Tyrol in northern Italy, located about  southeast of the city of Bolzano.

History

Coat-of-arms
The escutcheon is party per quarterly: the 1st and the 4th represent an or rampant lion on sable, the arms of the Judge Bartlmä von Pretzenberg which has had an estate in the municipality. In the 2nd and 3rd quarter an azure mountain is surmounted by an argent pretzels on gules. The emblem was adopted in 1967.

Geography

The municipality includes the village of Karersee, named after the nearby alpine lake by the same name, Karersee.

Welschnofen borders the following municipalities: Karneid, Moena, Deutschnofen, Predazzo, Sèn Jan di Fassa and Tiers.

Society
 
According to the 2011 census, 94.00% of the population speak German, 5.53% Italian and 0.47% Ladin as first language.

References

External links

Official website  
 Rosengarten Latemar 

Municipalities of South Tyrol